Jacqueline Alexandra Dyris (February 28, 1899 in Belgium – March 14, 1962 in Los Angeles, California) was a petite stage actress and silent film star, a native of Brussels, Belgium. Her father was of English and Dutch descent and her mother was Spanish and French. Jacqueline was educated in Europe and later Montreal, Quebec, Canada, Chicago, Illinois, and New York, New York.

Career
She was initially associated with Jack Norworth of Norworth and Bayes in Odds and Ends. Soon she participated in several vaudeville sketches. She relocated from New York to California due to health reasons in the early 1920s. In 1925 the actress appeared in the stage play, White Collars. The play continued more than a year at the Egan Theater in
Los Angeles, California.

Movies
Jacqueline's most noted movies are The Man Who Saw Tomorrow (1922) and The Godless Girl (1929). The latter was directed by Cecil B. Demille and starred Marie Prevost, Noah Beery, George Duryea, and Lina Basquette. She acted with Ina Claire in The Awful Truth (1929).

References

Los Angeles Times, Feminine Wiles, January 4, 1925, Page 29.
Los Angeles Times, She Has Love Cure, January 4, 1925, Page 37.
Los Angeles Times, An Addled Ancestry, April 5, 1925, Page 31.
Ogden Standard Examiner, Ogden, Utah, Comedy Drama At Egyptian, October 7, 1929, Page 9.

1899 births
1962 deaths
20th-century American actresses
20th-century Belgian actresses
American stage actresses
American film actresses
American silent film actresses
Belgian emigrants to the United States
Belgian film actresses
Belgian people of Spanish descent
Belgian silent film actresses
Vaudeville performers